Słupy  is a village in the administrative district of Gmina Tuchola, within Tuchola County, Kuyavian-Pomeranian Voivodeship, in north-central Poland. It is located in the historic region of Pomerania.

Słupy was a royal village of the Polish Crown, administratively located in the Tuchola County in the Pomeranian Voivodeship.

References

Villages in Tuchola County